Still is a studio album by American country singer-songwriter Bill Anderson. It was released on June 17, 1963 on Decca Records and was produced by Owen Bradley. Still was Anderson's debut studio album as a recording artist after recording several singles for the Decca label. Two singles were included in the album. Its most successful was the title track, which became a crossover hit in 1963. It reached positions on the Billboard country, pop and adult contemporary charts. The album itself would also reach peak position on Billboard charts.

Background and content
By 1963, Bill Anderson had been recording for Decca Records for five years. He signed with the label in 1958 and recorded several hits, including "The Tip of My Fingers" and "Mama Sang a Song". However, a proper debut studio album by Anderson had not yet been released. With the success of the title track in 1963, Decca decided to release his first full-length studio effort. The album's recording sessions were compiled from 1961. Further sessions were added on through early 1963. Sessions were first held at the Columbia Recording Studio in 1961 and were later held at Bradley's Barn, all located in Nashville, Tennessee. The album's recordings were produced by Owen Bradley, whom Anderson had been working with since his original signing.

Still consisted of 12 tracks. Five of the album's songs were written or co-written by Anderson, including the title track. Additional tracks were composed by other artists and songwriters. Further writers on the project included Ned Miller, Ernest Tubb and Fred Rose. Also included were cover versions of songs first recorded by others. These tracks were "From a Jack to a King", "Take These Chains from My Heart", "Little Band of Gold", "The Reverend Mr. Black", "It's Been So Long Darling" and "Down Came the Rain".

Release and reception

Before the album's release the first single was issued in February 1962. The single, "Get a Little Dirt on Your Hands", peaked at number 14 on the Billboard country singles chart. The second single issued was the title track in February 1963. It became Anderson's second single to reach number one on the Billboard country singles chart, reaching the top spot in April 1963. It also crossed over to the Hot 100 where it became a major hit and peaked at number eight in June 1963. It also reached a top ten position on the Billboard adult contemporary chart, peaking at number three.

Still was later given 3.5 stars from Allmusic in their review of the album. Still was originally released on June 17, 1963 via Decca Records. The album was first issued as a vinyl record, containing six songs on side one and six songs on side two. Upon its release, Still peaked at number ten on the Billboard Top Country Albums chart, becoming his first album to place on this chart. It also reach a peak position on the Billboard 200 album chart, reaching number 36 in September 1963. It would be Anderson's only studio release to make an appearance on the latter chart.

Track listing

Personnel
All credits are adapted from the liner notes of Still.

Musical personnel

 Bill Anderson – lead vocals
 Brenton Banks – strings
 Harold Bradley – guitar
 George Brinkley – strings
 Cecil Brower – strings
 Howard Carpenter – strings
 Martin Catahn – strings
 Floyd Cramer – piano
 Pete Drake – steel guitar
 Ray Edenton – guitar
 Sofie Fott – strings

 Buddy Harman – drums
 Lillian Hunt – strings
 Tommy Jackson – fiddle
 The Jordanaires – background vocals
 Jerry Kennedy – guitar
 The Anita Kerr Singers – background vocals
 Grady Martin – guitar
 Bill McElhiney – trumpet
 Bob Moore – bass
 Morris Palmer – drums
 Joe Zinkan – bass

Technical personnel
 Owen Bradley – record producer
 Hal Buksbaum – photography

Chart performance

Release history

References

1963 albums
Albums produced by Owen Bradley
Bill Anderson (singer) albums
Decca Records albums